Skillern is a locational surname of British origin, derived from Skeleron in Rimington, Lancashire. Variants of the name include Skillen, Skillin, and Skilling. The name may refer to:

Daphne Skillern (1928–2012), British police officer
James Skillen (born 1944), American theologian
John Skillern (1849–1934), American businessman
Keith Skillen (1948–2013), British football player
Rufus Skillern (born 1982), American football player
Jamie Skillen (born 1990), Poet

Other uses
Skillern House, Arkansas
Skillern Peak, Idaho
Skillen, Irland

References

English-language surnames
Toponymic surnames